Raimondo del Pozzo (17 January 1622 – 30 October 1694) was a Roman Catholic prelate who served as Bishop of Vieste (1668–1694).

Biography
Raimondo del Pozzo was born in Messina, Italy on 17 January 1622 and ordained a priest on 20 March 1649.
On 10 December 1668, he was appointed during the papacy of Pope Clement IX as Bishop of Vieste.
On 16 December 1668, he was consecrated bishop by Pietro Vito Ottoboni, Cardinal-Priest of San Marco, with Giacomo Altoviti, Titular Patriarch of Antiochia and Stefano Brancaccio, Titular Archbishop of Hadrianopolis in Haemimonto, serving as co-consecrators. 
He served as Bishop of Vieste until his death on 30 October 1694.

References

External links and additional sources
 (for Chronology of Bishops) 
 (for Chronology of Bishops)  

17th-century Roman Catholic bishops in the Republic of Venice
Bishops appointed by Pope Clement IX
1622 births
1694 deaths